Lhee is a hamlet in the Dutch province of Drenthe.

The hamlet was first mentioned in 1181 as "In Lede". The etymology is unclear.

Around 1800, a little school was built in Lhee. In 1953, it was moved brick by brick to the Netherlands Open Air Museum despite protests from the former teacher. Lhee was home to 229 people in 1840.

References

Populated places in Drenthe
Westerveld